Mokalsar railway station is a railway station in Barmer district, Rajasthan. Its code is MKSR. It serves Mokalsar village. The station consists of 2 platforms. Passenger, Express and Superfast trains halt here.

Trains

The following trains halt at Mokalsar railway station in both directions:

 Yesvantpur–Barmer AC Express
 Bhagat Ki Kothi–Ahmedabad Weekly Express
 Bikaner–Dadar Superfast Express
 Gandhidham–Jodhpur Express
 Bhagat Ki Kothi–Bandra Terminus Express (via Bhildi)

References

Railway stations in Barmer district
Jodhpur railway division